Hildegarde Švarce-Gešela (29 September 1907 – 4 December 1944) was a Latvian figure skater. She competed in the mixed pairs at the 1936 Winter Olympics. She died in an air raid on Heilbronn.

References

1907 births
1944 deaths
Sportspeople from Jelgava
Latvian female pair skaters
Olympic figure skaters of Latvia
Figure skaters at the 1936 Winter Olympics
German civilians killed in World War II
Deaths by airstrike during World War II
Latvian emigrants to Germany